Argyripnus ephippiatus, commonly known as Gilbert & Cramer's bristle-mouth fish, is a species of ray-finned fish in the genus Argyripnus found in the Pacific Ocean.

References

Tinker, S.W., 1978. Fishes of Hawaii, a handbook of the marine fishes of Hawaii and the Central Pacific Ocean. Hawaiian Service Inc., Honolulu. 568 p.

Taxa named by Charles Henry Gilbert
Taxa named by Frank Cramer
Fish described in 1897
Sternoptychidae